Ee Ganam Marakkumo is a 1978 Indian Malayalam-language film,  directed by N. Sankaran Nair and produced by Adoor Manikantan and Adoor Padmakumar. The film stars Prem Nazir, Sukumari, Jagathy Sreekumar, Adoor Bhasi and Debashree Roy. The film has musical score by Salil Chowdhary. This is the only work of Debashree Roy in Malayalam film industry till date. The film also marks the debut of Lalu Alex.

Cast

 Prem Nazir as Gopi
 Debashree Roy as Geetha
 Sukumari as Mariya Chedathi
 Jagathy Sreekumar as Wissle
 Adoor Bhasi
 Thikkurissy Sukumaran Nair as Raghavan Pillai, Gopi's father
 Jose Prakash as Raman Nair
 Sreelatha Namboothiri as Ponnamma
 Bahadoor as Mathai
 Jalaja
 K. P. Ummer as Kurup
 Lalu Alex - (Debut) as Vikraman
 Meena
 Konniyoor Vijayakumar
 Varghees
 Adoor Ravi
 Adoor Manikandan
 Cheriyan
 Balagopal
 Keshavan Nair

Soundtrack

References

External links
 

1978 films
1970s Malayalam-language films
Films scored by Salil Chowdhury
Films directed by N. Sankaran Nair